James Percy Mason (born August 14, 1950), is an American former professional baseball player. He played in Major League Baseball as a shortstop from 1971 to 1979 for the Washington Senators / Texas Rangers, New York Yankees, Toronto Blue Jays, and Montreal Expos. Mason was a member of the  American League pennant-winning New York Yankees team.

Career
Mason was born in Mobile, Alabama, where he attended Murphy High School. He was drafted by the Washington Senators in the 2nd round of the 1968 Major League Baseball draft. He made his major league debut with the Senators on September 26, 1971 at the age of 21. The 1971 season would be the Senator's final season in Washington D.C. before moving to Texas and changing their name to the Texas Rangers. 

Mason's contract was sold by the Rangers to the Yankees at the Winter Meetings on December 6, 1973. He was a member of the Yankees during the 1976 World Series against the Cincinnati Reds. Although he did not play in the 1976 American League Championship Series, he played three games in the World Series. In his only plate appearance of the series, Mason hit a home run off Pat Zachry. This turned out to be Mason's only postseason appearance, and the Yankees' only home run of their four-game series loss. It was also the 500th home run in the history of the World Series.

Because of Mason's low batting average, which hovered just over .200, his name, along with that of catcher Leo Dixon, was proposed for inclusion in a new term for poor hitting called the Mason Dixon Line (.204), which is closer to .200 than the Mendoza Line of Mario Mendoza (.215).

Mason is one of a handful of players to hit four doubles in one game, doing so while with the Yankees against his former team, the Rangers, at Arlington Stadium on July 8, 1974.

Sources

External links
, or Retrosheet, or Pelota Binaria (Venezuelan Winter League)

1950 births
Living people
American expatriate baseball players in Canada
Baseball players from Alabama
Buffalo Bisons (minor league) players
Cardenales de Lara players
American expatriate baseball players in Venezuela
Denver Bears players
Geneva Senators players
Major League Baseball shortstops
Montreal Expos players
New York Yankees players
Sportspeople from Mobile, Alabama
Texas Rangers players
Toronto Blue Jays players
Washington Senators (1961–1971) players